A Gift, known in Thai as Pohn Jak Fah (meaning "blessings from the sky"), is a 2016 Thai film released by GDH 559. An anthology in three segments, the film explores the theme of music as gifts and pays tribute to the late King Bhumibol Adulyadej's musical compositions.

Each of the film's segments is based on one of the King's compositions. The first segment, based on the song "Love at Sundown", is a romantic comedy directed by Chayanop Boonprakob and Kriangkrai Vachiratamporn. It stars Naphat Siangsomboon and Violette Wautier. The second, "Still on My Mind", is a family drama directed by Nithiwat Tharathorn, and stars Nittha Jirayungyurn and Sunny Suwanmethanont. The final segment, "New Year Greeting" is a comedy by Jira Maligool (who also co-produced the film), starring Chantavit Dhanasevi and Neungthida Sophon.

The film was originally slated for release on 1 December 2016, to celebrate King Bhumibol's birthday on 5 December as well as the upcoming new year. However, the King died on 13 October, and the producers considered postponing the release. They ultimately decided to keep to the original release date, making some minor edits so that the film would serve as a tribute to the late king.

A Gift was positively received. Critics described it as "funny and sentimental without being cloying," and, noting the release's relation to the King's passing, that "we need to smile, and this film has plenty to offer." It earned a moderate 42.88 million baht at the Thai box office (US$1.2 million), and was the fourth-grossing Thai film of 2016. The film won two Suphannahong National Film Awards, for Best Original Score and Best Recording and Sound Mixing.

References

External links
 
 

GDH 559 films
2016 films
Thai romantic comedy-drama films
Thai-language films
Thai anthology films